The McLaren Solus GT is a limited-production track-only mid-engined sports car manufactured by McLaren Automotive. The car is the sixth addition in the McLaren Ultimate Series, joining the McLaren F1, McLaren P1, McLaren Senna, McLaren Speedtail, and McLaren Elva. It is based on the 2017 Vision Gran Turismo concept that appeared in the Sony Interactive Entertainment game Gran Turismo Sport. The car is designed to be an "extreme expression of track driving engagement", and will be limited to 25 units, all of which come with a custom moulded seat, FIA-homologated race suit, helmet, and a bespoke HANS (head and neck support device).

Specifications

Powertrain
The engine has individual barrel-driven throttle bodies, with gear-driven camshafts, bespoke crank, intake and exhaust systems. The gearbox is of aluminium-magnesium construction and consists of straight-cut gears, with a carbon fibre clutch, and with the engine the two will act as stressed members.

Chassis
The chassis is a bespoke carbon fibre monocoque that incorporates numerous designs from Formula One, with 3D-printed titanium components used in the halo protecting the cockpit and roll bar, and carbon fibre crash structures similar to the ones found on Formula One cars. The car features double wishbone suspension with pushrod torsion bars at the front and pull-rod torsion bars at the rear, with four-way manually adjustable dampers. A sliding canopy on the roof the car slides open to allow the driver to climb into the sole seat in the vehicle, similar in fashion to the Lamborghini Egoista.

Bodywork
The bodywork also has a unique design that borrows from the current Formula One cars that employ the ground effect.

References

McLaren vehicles
Cars introduced in 2022
Sports cars
2020s cars
Rear mid-engine, rear-wheel-drive vehicles